Janda Baik (Bentong Malay: Jando Baék) is a village in Bentong District, Pahang, Malaysia. It is about 45 km from Kuala Lumpur and 800 m above sea level. It was estimated to have a population of around 2,820 in 2019.

Janda Baik was first settled by three Bentong villagers in 1930 who moved when the town was flooded in 1926. More villagers settled there afterwards, and the village was frequently visited by the Sultan of Pahang.

Although it formerly only focused on the agricultural industry, Janda Baik also focuses on the electronics and tourism industries today. However, the development of agriculture and tourism in Janda Baik has led to threats of deforestation that will affect the ecosystem, erode cultural and traditional values, and disrupt the villagers' daily lives, which has led to protests from villagers.

History

Foundation and etymology

Before Janda Baik was founded in 1930, the area was primarily inhabited by Orang Asli tribes. The village was founded when some residents moved from Bentong to an area with a higher elevation due to the 1926 floods that affected Bentong and other low elevation areas. The earliest founders for this village are Haji Deris, Haji Kadir, and Haji Yasir, who built a hut and stayed in the area for almost a week before others start to populate the area. The village was originally given the name Kampung Tiga Haji to refer to the three early settlers.

The rising population in Janda Baik caught the attention of Abu Bakar of Pahang, the Sultan of Pahang, who first visited the village in 1932. The Sultan disliked the village's name and asked for it to be changed.

An argument between the Orang Asli chief Tok Batin Wok and his wife Siah caused both to separate for a month before they reconciled. Four weeks later after their reconciliation, Bentong district officer Henry Peacock suggested that the name should be changed to Janda Baik, as janda in Malay means "divorcee" (or "widow") and baik refers to the relationship between Orang Asli chief Tok Batin Wok and his wife Siah, which improved since they reunited. The village was officially renamed to Janda Baik on 19 September 1936.

Another reason Janda Baik was chosen as the village name is that a widow had helped treat the injured Pahang army returning to their base in Pahang when they fought in the civil war in Selangor. She offered medicine to treat the injured people. Because of this, the village was given the name Janda Baik to honor her kindness, where janda and baik respectively mean "widow" (or "divorcee") and "good" in the Malay language.

In the village, there used to be an island called Pulau Santap that was located in the middle of the big stream that ran through it. It was used by the Sultan of Pahang as resting place; the word santap refers to eating in Malay language. The island eroded due to development in the area.

Post-independence

Janda Baik started to become popular after the late Tan Sri Muhammad Ghazali Shafie, the former Foreign Affairs Minister of Malaysia, survived the Cessna 206 air crash on January 11, 1982, in Janda Baik when he was going to Kuala Lipis to attend a UMNO division committee meeting. The Malaysian government feared that a Federal Government's Minister may have been captured by communist guerillas due to his participation in fights against the Japanese Red Army from 1973 to 1981. He survived with light injuries while the co-pilot (Vergis Chacko) and his bodyguard (Charon Daan) were killed in the crash.

As Kuala Lumpur became more crowded and congested, a proposal was made to build a new administrative center known as Putrajaya, where the administrative buildings and offices would be relocated to. In 1990, the government listed six possible places to build Putrajaya, one of which was in Janda Baik. They decided to build it in Perang Besar, Selangor.

In August 2019, villagers protested further development of ecotourism in this area that were silently implemented by authorities without the residents' consent. They claimed that ecotourism development would erode cultural and traditional values, and disrupt the villagers' daily lives. The residents demanded that the authorities should focus on improving the road conditions and cleaning the river instead.

In September 2021, the Malaysian Celebrity Vie Shantie Khan announced that Janda Baik belongs to the Gombak district.

Geography

Janda Baik is located on the Titiwangsa Range of Peninsular Malaysia. The village is surrounded by coniferous forest. However there are deforestation threats due to increases in agricultural activity in this area and the proposed TNB transmission tower wiring project which was cancelled in 2015 after protests from residents over concerns of river erosion. On December 2017, a reforestation and forest conservation program was launched in Janda Baik as part of Sultan Ahmad Shah Environment Trust (SASET)'s pledge to plant 100,000 trees in state of Pahang in 2018. This program aims to reforest areas previously cleared by logging and development. A biodiversity research center, Janda Baik Wildlife Fauna Breeding and Research facility, operates in Janda Baik and several wildlife species have been studied, including siamang, whose preferred habitat is mountainous. In addition, other species discovered in Janda Baik include Indian whistling duck which has longer legs and an erect posture more similar to goose than other duck species.

Climate
Janda Baik's climate is classified as tropical. Rainfall is significant in this area throughout the year. The climate is Af according to the Köppen-Geiger climate classification system. December has the lowest average temperature of the year—.

Economy

Most early residents made their living in agriculture through small rubber plantations and paddy (oryza sativa) cultivation mainly because Janda Baik has a rich natural network of rivers. In addition, farmers also plant bananas on paddy fields. However, due to lack of maintenance on the paddy fields, the yields declined rapidly and the fields were invaded by Imperata cylindrica. About 55% of the residents surveyed identified as farmers in 2001.

In recent years, some people moved from urban areas to Janda Baik to set up farming businesses, experience a cooler climate, or escape from an urban livelihood. Urban farmers sold their vegetables to customers and restaurants in Janda Baik. Fig plantations became a tourist attraction in Janda Baik.

The electronics industry in Janda Baik started when Elektrisola, a German-based electronics corporation, opened its factory in 1990. It focused on manufacturing copper wires and litz wires to support the rapidly growing Asian market and economy, and created 1,000 jobs for villagers and nearby inhabitants. 90% of the products produced are exported to Asia, Europe, and Latin America.

Sports and recreation

In recent years, Janda Baik has become a popular spot for cyclists and trail runners. The town has become popular among cyclists who perceive it as an ideal place for cycling due to its route's hill terrain were perceived as challenging, in addition to scenic views, little traffic, cold climate and a cuisine haven. The village is also popular for trail running due to its hilly slopes, and also has a swimming pool, paintball and ATV driving.

References

Bibliography
 Harold Brookfield (2001). Exploring Agrodiversity. New York City: Columbia University Press.

External links

Villages in Pahang
Populated places in Pahang
Populated places established in 1930